Mercado Central is a Spanish soap opera television series based on an original idea by David Plana that originally aired on La 1 from 23 September 2019 to 21 January 2021. The series' ensemble cast features the likes of Antonio Garrido, Begoña Maestre, Lola Marceli and Jesús Olmedo, among others.

Premise 
The plot revolves around the working and personal relationships and mishaps established among the people whose earnings depend on the stalls of a market located in current-day Madrid. The latter faces the prospect of municipal closure.

Cast

Production and release 
The opening theme ("Una luz en la ciudad") was composed by Jesús Díaz and performed by Rozalén and Carlos Sadness. Production of the series was disrupted by the COVID-19 pandemic. The series premiered on La 1 on 23 September 2019, placed in the sobremesa time slot. After 310 episodes, the broadcasting run ended on 22 January 2021.

References

External links 
 Mercado Central on RTVE Play

La 1 (Spanish TV channel) network series
Spanish-language television shows
2019 Spanish television series debuts
2021 Spanish television series endings
Spanish television soap operas
2010s Spanish drama television series
2020s Spanish drama television series
Television shows filmed in Spain
Television shows set in Madrid
Television series set in shops
Television series by Diagonal TV